Eucithara coniformis is a small sea snail, a marine gastropod mollusc in the family Mangeliidae.

Description
The length of the shell attains 9 mm.

Distribution

References

  Reeve, L.A. 1846. Monograph of the genus Mangelia. pls 1-8 in Reeve, L.A. (ed). Conchologia Iconica. London : L. Reeve & Co. Vol. 3.

External links
  Tucker, J.K. 2004 Catalog of recent and fossil turrids (Mollusca: Gastropoda). Zootaxa 682:1-1295.
 

coniformis
Gastropods described in 1846